"Juke Box Baby" is a song written by Joe Sherman and Noel Sherman and performed by Perry Como. It reached #10 on the U.S. pop chart and #22 on the UK Singles Chart in 1956.

Background
The single features The Ray Charles Singers and Mitchell Ayres and His Orchestra and was arranged by Joe Reisman.

Other versions
Sid Phillips and His Band released a version of the song as a single in the UK in 1956, but it did not chart.

References

1956 songs
1956 singles
1950s ballads
Songs with lyrics by Noel Sherman
Songs written by Joe Sherman (songwriter)
Perry Como songs
RCA Records singles
His Master's Voice singles
Songs about music
Songs about jukeboxes